Alice Jane Bernheim Brush is an American computer scientist known for her research in human-computer interaction, ubiquitous computing and computer supported collaborative work (CSCW).  She is particularly known  for her research studying and building technology for homes as well as expertise conducting field studies of technology.  
She is the Co-Chair of CRA-W from 2014–2017.

Biography
Brush received a B.A. in Computer Science and Mathematics 
from Williams College in 1996. She received a M.S. in Computer Science from the University of Washington in 1998 and a Ph.D in Computer Science from the University of Washington in 2002.

She then was a Postdoctoral Fellow at the University of Washington from 2002–2004. She then joined Microsoft Research.

Career

Brush currently focuses on home automation research and co-leads the Lab of Things project, a publicly available platform for experimental research using connected devices in homes. Brush's research on the challenges and opportunities of smart homes based on interviews with people living in smart homes  informed the design of the Lab of Things software.
 
Brush and her collaborators conducted research on family coordination and calendaring  and built prototypes  that influenced Windows Live Calendar and the Windows Phone Family Room feature. Studying use of technology in homes, Brush and her colleagues have repeatedly demonstrated how frequently devices are shared in households, even devices typically considered "personal" such as mobile devices.  She has co-developed and tested multiple alternative paradigms for user account management that better match shared usage.

Awards

Brush received the CRA-W 2010 Borg Early Career Award.

Her other notable awards include:
 Best Paper Nominee for a CHI 2006 paper: LINC-ing" the Family: The Participatory Design of an Inkable Family Calendar 
 2011 Pervasive Computing Best Paper Award for: Learning Time-Based Presence Probabilities
 2011 Pervasive Computing Best Paper Nominee for: SpeakerSense: Energy Efficient Unobtrusive
 2010 Pervasive Health Best Paper Award for: Automatic Classification of Daily Fluid Intake
 2005 HICCS Best Paper Nominee for: 'Today' Messages: Lightweight Support for Small Group Awareness via Email

References

External links
 Microsoft Research: A.J.Brush Computational User Experiences Group
 

American women computer scientists
University of Washington alumni
Williams College alumni
Living people
People from Wilmington, Delaware
Year of birth missing (living people)
Microsoft employees
Microsoft Research people
American computer scientists
Scientists from Delaware
21st-century American scientists
21st-century American women scientists